Pretoria Castle (later S.A. Oranje) was an ocean liner operated by the Union-Castle Line in service between Britain and South Africa during the mid 20th century.

She was built by Harland and Wolff of Belfast at a cost of £2.5 million, and was launched on 19 August 1947, with her christening performed by the wife of South African Prime Minister Jan Smuts. She made her maiden voyage in July 1948. In 1953, she was present for the fleet review as part of the Coronation of Queen Elizabeth II. She was refit twice in the mid 1960s, with modifications externally to her masts and internally with the addition of air conditioning and added private bathrooms. In January 1966, she was sold to South African shipping company Safmarine via its British subsidiary and renamed S.A. Oranje, though she continued in Union Castle service and was manned by that company's crew until 1969, when Safmarine took full control and she was registered in South Africa. She made her last revenue run in September 1975 after fuel oil prices rose sharply in the preceding years, and sailed for scrapping in Taiwan in November.

She had a passenger capacity of 755—214 in first class and 541 in tourist class—and a crew of 400.

References

Ships of the Union-Castle Line
1947 ships
Ships built by Harland and Wolff